Carolyn Rayna Buckle (born 29 August 2000) is a Singaporean-born Australian synchronised swimmer. She represented Australia at the 2020 Summer Olympics. The artistic swimming team consisting of Hannah Burkhill, Kiera Gazzard, Alessandra Ho, Kirsten Kinash, Rachel Presser, Emily Rogers, Amie Thompson and Buckle were able to progress to the final, however, they finished ninth.

Early years 
Buckle was born on 29 August 2000 in Singapore to a Singaporean mother and an Australian father. At the age of 15, she competed at the 2015 FINA World Championships. Buckle was part of Singapore's squad in the Team event who finished in the top-20 (19th). At the 2019 FINA World Championships in South Korea. Buckle achieved two top-20 results, placed 20th in the Team Free and 19th in the Team Technical competitions. At FINA's World Series event in April 2019 held in Japan, Buckle was part of Team Singapore that finished 5th in the Team Technical and 6th in the Team Free competitions.

Buckle moved to Australia in 2020 to study for her Bachelor of Applied Science (Physiotherapy) at the University of Sydney, after completing her studies at the Methodist Girls School in Singapore. She is currently a member of the Sydney Emeralds artistic swimming team, who train at Cook and Phillip Pool at Hyde Park.

References

External links 

 School sports: MGS lap up applause and titles at synchronised swimming championships

2000 births
Living people
Australian synchronised swimmers
Olympic synchronised swimmers of Australia
Synchronized swimmers at the 2020 Summer Olympics
Singaporean people of Australian descent
Singaporean swimmers
Singaporean sportswomen
Australian people of Singaporean descent